The 2011 Norfolk State Spartans football team represented Norfolk State University in the 2011 NCAA Division I FCS football season. The Spartans were led by seventh-year head coach Pete Adrian and played their home games at William "Dick" Price Stadium. They are a member of the Mid-Eastern Athletic Conference MEAC. They finished the season 9–3, 7–1 in MEAC play to win the conference championship. They received the conference's automatic bid into the FCS playoffs, where they lost in the first round to Old Dominion.

Schedule

References

Norfolk State
Norfolk State Spartans football seasons
Mid-Eastern Athletic Conference football champion seasons
Norfolk State
Norfolk State Spartans football